Ferrol is a small unincorporated community in Augusta County, Virginia, United States, near Staunton.

Nearby places in Virginia
Mount Elliott Springs (2.0 km), Augusta Springs (3.0 km), Chapin (4.5 km), Summerdean (4.5 km), North Mountain (5.8 km), McKinley (7.4 km), Trimbles Mill (6.5 km), Estaline (8.1 km), Buffalo Gap (9.6 km), Middlebrook (8.9 km), Swoope (8.8 km), Christian (9.6 km), Fordwick (8.7 km), Craigsville (9.2 km), Little Baltimore (11.9 km).

External links 
 Maps of Ferrol

Unincorporated communities in Virginia
Unincorporated communities in Augusta County, Virginia